John Cuff may refer to: 

 John Cuff (baseball) (1864–1916), American baseball player
 John Cuff (optician) (1708–1772), English scientific instrument maker
 John Cuff (politician) (1805–1864), New Zealand politician